Sally Elizabeth Talbot (born 22 March 1953) is an Australian politician. She has been a Labor Party member of the Western Australian Legislative Council since 2005, representing the region of South West.

Biography
Talbot came from a family active in the British Labour Party where politics was actively discussed and engaged in. At 16 she finished her secondary schooling and attended the Royal College of Music in London, specialising in the cello. She spent the next 15 years working as a musician, however she said her life always turned back to her interest in politics.

While attending Murdoch University in Perth in 1983, she joined the staff as a federal member of parliament, her first formal job in politics. In 2001 she became the Assistant Secretary of the Labor Party, a position she held until 2005. It was in this role that she discovered the importance of engaging ordinary citizens in politics to create a better community, thus it was important to have active and healthy political parties. She left her staff role with the party to become a member of parliament, and later as the first President of the Western Australian branch of the Labor Party to be elected by popular ballot in 2008. Perth is openly gay.

References

External links
 WA Parliament bio

1953 births
Living people
Lesbian politicians
Members of the Western Australian Legislative Council
Australian Labor Party members of the Parliament of Western Australia
Murdoch University alumni
Alumni of the Royal College of Music
English emigrants to Australia
21st-century Australian politicians
21st-century Australian women politicians
Women members of the Western Australian Legislative Council
Australian LGBT politicians